Naujawan may refer to:
 Naujawan (1937 film), a 1937 Bollywood film by Aspi Irani
 Naujawan (1951 film), a Hindi film by Mahesh Kaul
 Naujawan (album), a 1996 album by Shaan
 Naujawan Bharat Sabha, a left-wing Indian association

See also 
 Chal Chal Re Naujawan, a 1944 Indian film
 Hum Naujawan, a 1985 Indian film